The 5th Parliament of William III was summoned by William III of England on 26 December 1700 and assembled on 6 February 1701. The party political constitution of the new House of Commons was 249 Tories, 219 Whigs and 45 others, representing a significant swing in favour of the Tories. Robert Harley, the Tory member for Radnor, who had declined a post in William III's new ministry, was elected Speaker of the House.

The two main issues facing the new Parliament were clear. One was the issue of the succession, following the death of Princess Anne's only surviving child during the Summer and the other was the threat of war with France. A ‘bill of settlement’, which would invite the Protestant House of Hanover to accept the English throne was piloted through both Houses, albeit on terms which would further restrict royal prerogative, by 22 May 1701.

Initially Parliament was of one accord as far as the ratification of the second Partition Treaty, which was an agreement between Britain and other powers to decide the division of the Spanish kingdom and Empire upon the death on 1 November 1700 of the imbecilic King Carlos II without heirs. When Parliament discovered that the King's emissary Lord Portland had already concluded the treaty without their knowledge or approval he was impeached, followed by Junto members Charles Montagu, the Earl of Orford and John Somers. All, however, escaped punishment.

Outspoken Tory reluctance to finance another war with Spain had mellowed by the end of the Parliament. The Whigs were very much in favour of war and persuaded the King of the need for another election that year. Parliament was thus dissolved on 11 November 1701 and another Parliament summoned later that month.

Notable Acts passed in the Parliament
Act of Settlement 1701
British Museum Act 1700
Plate Assay Act 1700

See also 
 Acts of the 5th Parliament of William III
 List of parliaments of England

References

  - Note: 5th Parliament considered to be the 4th by History of Parliament

1701 establishments in England
1701 in politics
The Restoration